Trezzi is an Italian surname. Notable people with the surname include: 

 Carlo Raffaele Trezzi (born 1982), Italian footballer
 Fabrizio Trezzi (born 1967), Italian cyclist

See also
 Trezza

Italian-language surnames